Andy Howson (born May 29, 1979) is a British Muay Thai fighter from The Bad Company gym based in Leeds. He is a five-time world champion in the 55 kg super bantamweight division. Howson retired from fighting in 2015. He later made a comeback to fighting on April 28, 2018 with 2nd round head kick knockout win over World Champion Gianpiero Sportelli from Italy. A few short months after this Andy was approached by the largest Martial Arts Organisation in the World today One Championship and signed a 5 fight deal. He is currently ranked no:5 in the One Championship Straw-weight Division.

Muay Thai career
During Andy's 24 year career he has remarkable achievements. Andy managed to become a 5 times world champion including prestigious WBC World title at 53.5 kg, 2x Intercontinental Champion, 2x Commonwealth champion, European champion, 2x British champion and English champion in his impressive 88 fight career where he picked up 74 wins (27 by KO) 13 losses and 1 draw. Andy is known outside of Thailand as one of the best ever bantamweight fighters and have proved this on many occasions by fighting and beating the best in his fighting career. Andy is a former UK no.1 and has only lost twice in his weight division against English opponents.

For the past two decades Andy has passionately dedicated his time to the sport of Muay Thai, in the infamous gym Bad Company (Leeds). Since his humble beginnings Andy has gone on to compete across the world, testing his talents against best fighters in his weight.

Andy is known as 'The Punisher', or 'Lord of War', for his aggressive fighting style and prodigious heart and for never give up attitude and always going for war to win. An excellent example of that is Andy Howson vs Dean James and the iconic round 4.

Andy for years been fighting top caliber opponents and holds wins over names like Damien Trainor 3x(one by a way of stoppage), Mohamed Bouchareb(WBC World Title), Mohad Ali Yakub (WMC World title), Weera 'Spicy' Minghton and many top level Thais including a Lumpiniee, Rajadamnern and Thailand champion Somboombap Phumpaneang (KO 1st round).

Howson picked up his 5th world title in 2014 beating Mohamed Bouchareb on points for the vacant WBC bantamweight title. He then retired in 2015 after losing by stoppage to Joseph Lasiri from Italy.

Howson now runs the Muay Thai gym Science of 8 located in West Bromwich and is producing many champion fighters.
Howson come back to fight k-1 world champion Gianpiero Sportelli from Monopoli in 2018.

Andy Howson next fought Josh Tonna of Australia at ONE Championship: Warrior's Code on February 7, 2020. Howson lost the fight by second-round knockout.

Titles and accomplishments
 International Sport Karate Association
 2008 ISKA Muay Thai World Bantamweight Champion
 World Muaythai Council
 2009 WMC World Super Bantamweight Champion
 WBC Muay Thai
 2014 WBC Muay Thai World Bantamweight Champion

Fight record

|-  style="background:#FFBBBB;"
| 2020-02-07 || Loss ||align=left| Josh Tonna || ONE Championship: Warrior's Code || Kallang, Singapore || KO (Knee to the head) || 2 || 2:20
|-  style="background:#CCFFCC;"
| 2018-04-28 || Win ||align=left| Gianpiero Sportelli || HGH Promotions || United Kingdom || KO || 2 ||
|- style="background:#fbb;"
| 2015-04-26|| Loss||align=left| Joseph Lasiri ||  || United Kingdom || TKO || 2 ||
|-  style="background:#FFBBBB;"
| 2014-12-06 || Loss||align=left| Danial Williams || Caged Muay Thai 5 || Queensland, Australia || Decision (split) || 3 || 3:00 
|-
! style=background:white colspan=9 |
|-  style="background:#CCFFCC;"
| 2014-09-06 || Win ||align=left| Mohamed Bouchareb || Smash Muaythai 10 || United Kingdom || Decision || 3 || 3:00
|-
! style=background:white colspan=9 |
|-  style="background:#CCFFCC;"
| 2013-11-02 || Win ||align=left| Aaron O'Callaghan || The Main Event || United Kingdom || Decision || 5 || 3:00
|-  style="background:#FFBBBB;"
| 2012-12-01 || Loss ||align=left| Thanit Watthanaya || Muay Thai in America: In Honor of the King || Los Angeles, United States || TKO || 5 ||
|-  style="background:#FFBBBB;"
| 2012-10-06 || Loss ||align=left| Aaron O'Callaghan || Muay Thai Super Fights || Cork, Ireland || Decision (split) || 5 || 3:00
|-  style="background:#fbb;"
| 2012-08-12|| Loss||align=left| Nobuchika Terado || Krush.21 || Tokyo, Japan || KO  || 2 || 2:07
|-
! style=background:white colspan=9 |
|-  style="background:#CCFFCC;"
| 2012-06-24 || Win||align=left| Damien Trainor || Thai Boxing ||  United Kingdom || Decision || 5 || 3:00
|-  style="background:#CCFFCC;"
| 2012-02-18 || Win ||align=left| Viet Hoang || The Thai Boxing Takeover || United Kingdom || Decision || 5 || 3:00
|-  style="background:#FFBBBB;"
| 2011-05-07 || Loss ||align=left| Dean James || World Championship Muaythai || United Kingdom || TKO || 4 ||
|-
! style=background:white colspan=9 |
|-  style="background:#CCFFCC;"
| 2010-06-26 || Win ||align=left| Carlo Pappada || World Championship Thaiboxing || United Kingdom || TKO || 4 ||
|-  style="background:#FFBBBB;"
| 2012-04-03 || Loss ||align=left| Romie Adanza || Muay Thai in America ||  Santa Monica, United States || Decision (Split)|| 5 || 3:00
|-  style="background:#FFBBBB;"
| 2010-03-27 || Loss ||align=left| Dean James || MSA Muaythai Premier League || United Kingdom || Decision || 3 || 3:00
|-  style="background:#FFBBBB;"
| 2009-11-07 || Loss ||align=left| Rungravee Sasiprapa || MSA Muaythai Premier League || United Kingdom || TKO || 3 ||
|-  style="background:#CCFFCC;"
| 2009-06-13 || Win||align=left| Mohd Ali Yakuub || World Championship Thai Boxing ||  United Kingdom ||  Decision || 5 || 3:00
|-
! style=background:white colspan=9 |
|-  style="background:#cfc;"
| 2009-02-07 || Win ||align=left| Damien Trainor || Muaythai Legends - England vs. Thailand ||  United Kingdom || Decision || 5 || 3:00
|-  style="background:#FFBBBB;"
| 2008-11-30 || Loss||align=left| Super K Sitjaipetch || Contender Asia UK Eliminator ||  United Kingdom || Decision || 3 || 3:00
|-  style="background:#CCFFCC;"
| 2008-10-18 || Win||align=left| Kunitaka || Muay Thai CLASH 11 in Leeds ||  United Kingdom || Decision (Majority) || 5 || 3:00
|-
! style=background:white colspan=9 |
|-  style="background:#CCFFCC;"
| 2008-06-14 || Win||align=left| Weera Mingthon || Bad Company Show ||  United Kingdom || Decision || 3 || 3:00
|-  style="background:#FFBBBB;"
| 2008-05-04 || Loss||align=left| Dmitry Varats || Power of Scotland 4 ||  United Kingdom || TKO || 2 ||
|-  style="background:#CCFFCC;"
| 2008-05-04 || Win||align=left| Somboonbab || Power of Scotland 4 ||  United Kingdom || TKO || 1 ||
|-  style="background:#CCFFCC;"
| 2007-11-25 || Win||align=left| Jaotapee Kiatkorwit || Supreme World Muay Thai Championship ||  United Kingdom || KO || 3 || 
|-
! style=background:white colspan=9 |
|-  style="background:#CCFFCC;"
| 2007-10-14 || Win||align=left| Fernando Machado || Combat Superfights ||  United Kingdom || KO  || 2 ||
|-  style="background:#CCFFCC;"
| 2006-11-26 || Win||align=left| Oleg Mihailov || Muay Thai Super Fight ||  United Kingdom || TKO  || 2 ||
|-  style="background:#CCFFCC;"
| 2006-06-17 || Win||align=left| Albert Veera Chey || World Class Professional Thai Boxing ||  United Kingdom || Decision  || 5 || 3:00
|-  style="background:#FFBBBB;"
| 2006-02-26 || Loss||align=left| Damien Trainor || Combat Superfights ||  United Kingdom || Decision (majority) || 5 || 3:00
|-  style="background:#c5d2ea
| 2005-11-20 || Draw||align=left| Kantipong || Muay Thai Superfights ||  United Kingdom || Decision  || 5 || 3:00
|-  style="background:#CCFFCC;"
| 2005-06-26 || Win||align=left| Sebastien Ocaña || Thai Boxing ||  United Kingdom || Decision  || 5 || 3:00
|-
! style=background:white colspan=9 |
|-  style="background:#CCFFCC;"
| 2005-02-27 || Win||align=left| Damien Trainor || Master Sken's Fight Night ||  United Kingdom || TKO (Injury) || 3 ||
|-  style="background:#CCFFCC;"
| 2004-11-28 || Win||align=left| Simone Grenzi || ||  United Kingdom || TKO || 3 || 
|-
! style=background:white colspan=9 |
|-  style="background:#CCFFCC;"
| 2004-10-10 || Win||align=left| Eoghan Murphy || Thaiboxing ||  United Kingdom || TKO || 4 ||
|-  style="background:#fbb;"
| 2004 || Loss||align=left| Reece Crooke || ||  United Kingdom || Decision (Unanimous) || 5 || 3:00
|-  style="background:#CCFFCC;"
| 2003-04-28 || Win||align=left| Abdel Soussi || Thaiboxing ||  United Kingdom || Disqualification  ||  || 
|-
| colspan=9 | Legend:

References

Living people
English Muay Thai practitioners
English male kickboxers
ONE Championship kickboxers
1979 births